Mason Cyrille Elong Ewing (born April 9, 1982) is a French, Cameroonian and American producer, director, scriptwriter and fashion designer living in France and the United States. Although he is blind, he has built a thriving business and artistic career.

Biography

Early life 
Ewing was born in Douala, the economic capital of Cameroon. His father, Frederik Ewing, is an American businessman who died in November 2010. Mason lived until age four with his Cameroonian mother, Marie Francesca Elong, who was a model and seamstress. She inspired him and gave him a taste for fashion.
Mason spent a lot of time with her as she made clothes for her children. His mother died in March 1986.

His great-grandmother Élise then took care of him for three years. In 1989, he moved to the Paris region where he lived with his uncle and aunt Lucien and Jeannette Ekwalla, where he suffered extreme child abuse. Not only was he locked in a room for eight years and beaten, but also chili pepper was thrown in his eyes for a number of years. In 1993, distraught, he ran often away to seek help from the police and judges, asking to be removed from the care of his uncle and aunt.

Due to their mistreatment, Mason tragically lost his sight in April 1996 and fell into a coma for three weeks at the Necker-Enfants malades Hospital in Paris. In 2001, he was homeless and ended up at SAMU (Emergency medical services in France). He won a court judgment against his uncle and aunt, for €5000 (which was never paid) and a one-year suspended sentence.

Career 
Alongside his fashion projects, Mason Ewing works on film projects in France and the U.S. He created the children's series The Adventures of Madison highlighting Baby Madison and the Mickey Boom series. In 2011, he moved to America to become a film producer. His holding company, Mason Ewing Corporation, in Los Angeles has various projects in film and TV production. He wrote a television series Eryna Bella and produced Descry, a short film.

Starting in April 2015, his French subsidiary Les Entreprises Ewing, subsidiary of Mason Ewing Corporation is based in Clichy, France. He is member of the French production trade union UPC.

After living in Los Angeles for a few years, he returned to France to focus on his popular TV series Mickey Boom, supported by French and international channels. This series was inspired by the American television shows he loved to watch as an adolescent.

He produced the feature film Love in Yaoundé, a romantic comedy, in 2019.

Awards 
In 2018, Mason Ewing was awarded the A.I.M. Award by Afrimpact Magazine in Pennsylvania for his community work. For many years he has supported the Association for the Blind and Visually Impaired and the Le Comité Contre l'Esclavage Moderne. He is also an Ambassador for the Humanity & Inclusion NGO and the Le Refuge association for youths LGBTQ+ at risk. He is supports by the  Secretary of State for Child Protection Adrien Taquet.

Filmography

Feature film 
Love in Yaounde (release planned in 2019)

Short film 
2011: Descry
2017: Névroses
2017: Comme Les Autres
2017: Le Plus Beau Cadeau de ma Mère

References

External links 
 
 
 Mason Ewing at Allociné
 Mason Ewing at Unifrance

People from Douala
French film directors
French screenwriters
Cameroonian film producers
French television producers
French film producers
American blind people
French chief executives
1982 births
Living people
20th-century American writers
French blind people